Royal Air Force Friston or more simply RAF Friston is a former Royal Air Force satellite station and Emergency Landing Ground located in East Sussex, England.

Units

The following units were here at some point:
 No. 32 Squadron RAF, two visits between 14 June 1942 and 20 August 1942 with Hawker Hurricanes.
 No. 41 Squadron RAF, three visits between 27 May 1943 and 11 July 1944 with Supermarine Spitfires.
 No. 64 Squadron RAF between 7 August 1943 and 19 August 1943 with Spitfires.
 No. 131 Squadron RAF
 No. 253 Squadron RAF Its Spitfires arrived on 13 June 1942 [5]
 No. 306 Polish Fighter Squadron
 No. 308 Polish Fighter Squadron
 No. 316 Polish Fighter Squadron
 No. 349 (Belgian) Squadron RAF Arrived on 22 October 1943 [5]
 No. 350 (Belgian) Squadron RAF
 No. 411 Squadron RCAF
 No. 412 Squadron RCAF Squadron Detachments with Spitfires there from November 1942 to January 1943, before the squadron arrived on 21 June 1943 with Spitfire Mk. Vb aircraft [5] 
 No. 501 Squadron RAF
 No. 610 Squadron RAF
 No. 666 Squadron RAF Its Auster aircraft appeared on 18 April 1945 and stayed a little over a month [5]
 No. 7 Fighter Command Servicing Unit - arrived in early 1945 [5]
 No. 2720 Squadron RAF Regiment
 No. 2727 Squadron RAF Regiment
 No. 2751 Squadron RAF Regiment
 No. 2762 Squadron RAF Regiment
 No. 2792 Squadron RAF Regiment
 No. 2793 Squadron RAF Regiment
 No. 2803 Squadron RAF Regiment
 No. 2807 Squadron RAF Regiment
 No. 2846 Squadron RAF Regiment
 No. 2851 Squadron RAF Regiment
 No. 4065 Anti-Aircraft Flight RAF Regiment
 Air Sea Rescue Flight RAF, Shoreham/Friston/Shoreham (1941) became 'C' Flight, No. 277 Squadron RAF

References

Citations

Bibliography

Fristo
Friston